Ankara, the capital of Turkey, has a total of 7 skyscrapers, defined as buildings taller than 150 meters (492 feet), as of April 2020. Outside of Istanbul, Turkey's largest city, Ankara contains some of the country's tallest buildings. The Elya Tower will be the tallest building in Ankara when it is completed in 2020, measuring 210 meters in height. It will replace the Kuzu Effect building, which has a height of 186 meters and was completed in 2018.

Prior to the 2010s, Ankara had no buildings taller than 150 meters. The Sheraton Ankara, a hotel and convention centre, was one of the first notable tall buildings to be built in the city, in 1991. However, it did not reach a height of 150 meters; the first building to do so was the Portakal Cicegi Tower, which was completed in 2011. The decade saw a major boom in the construction of high-rises and skyscrapers in Ankara, similar to the Turkish cities of Istanbul and Izmir; all 7 of Ankara's skyscrapers were built after 2010.

A supertall, the Merkez Ankara Office Tower, is under construction in Ankara, measuring 301 meters in height. Upon its completion, it will be Turkey's first supertall, the tallest building in Ankara, and the tallest building in the entirety of Turkey. Most of Ankara's skyscrapers are located in Söğütözü, Ankara's business district.

Tallest buildings
The following list ranks complete buildings in Ankara by height that are at least 125 meters tall.

Observation and TV towers of Ankara

Tall buildings of Ankara under construction
List of buildings under construction which are higher than 90 m, including spires and architectural details. Based on floorcounts and floorheights; buildings without official height (including spires and architectural details) are also included as they are estimated to be higher than 90 m.

Timeline

See also

Ankara
List of tallest buildings in Turkey

References

Ankara-related lists
Ankara

Ankara
Tallest, Ankara